Urðr (Old Norse "fate") is one of the Norns in Norse mythology. Along with Verðandi (possibly "happening" or "present") and Skuld (possibly "debt" or "future"), Urðr makes up a trio of Norns that are described as deciding the fates of people. Urðr is attested in stanza 20 of the Poetic Edda poem Völuspá and the Prose Edda book Gylfaginning.

Urðr is together with the other Norns located at the well Urðarbrunnr beneath the world ash tree  Yggdrasil of Asgard. They spin threads of life, cut marks in the pole figures and measure  people's destinies, which shows the fate of all human beings and gods. Norns are always present when a child is born and decide its fate. The three Norns represent the past (Urðr), future (Skuld) and present (Verðandi).

Urðr is commonly written as Urd or Urth. In some English translations, her name is glossed with the Old English form of urðr; Wyrd.

Attestations

Poetic Edda
Yggdrasil is said to stand "always over Urd's well", or the well of fate, Urd's well is located in Asgard. Urd appears in the Völva's Prophecy Völuspá:

References

Sources
Bellows, Henry Adams (Trans.) (1923). The Poetic Edda. New York: The American-Scandinavian Foundation.
 Orchard, Andy (1997) Dictionary of Norse Myth and Legend  (Orion Publishing Group) 
 Lindow, John (2001) Norse Mythology: A Guide to the Gods, Heroes, Rituals, and Beliefs (Oxford University Press) 
Steinsland, Gro (2005)  Norrøn religion : myter, riter, samfunn (Oslo: Pax forlag) 
Bugge, Sophus (2010)  Norroen Fornkvaedi (Nabu Press) 
Thorpe, Benjamin (Trans.) (1907). The Elder Edda of Saemund Sigfusson. Norrœna Society.

Norns
Female supernatural figures in Norse mythology
Textiles in folklore
Time and fate goddesses
Gýgjar